The East Fork Williams Fork is a tributary of the Williams Fork in north central Colorado in the United States. The river merges with the South Fork Williams Fork to form the Williams Fork. Perhaps the most unusual river name in Colorado is the West Fork East Fork Williams Fork, a tributary of the East Fork Williams Fork.

See also
 List of rivers of Colorado

References

Rivers of Colorado
Rivers of Garfield County, Colorado
Rivers of Routt County, Colorado
Rivers of Rio Blanco County, Colorado
Tributaries of the Colorado River in Colorado